The Shire of Healesville was a local government area about  northeast of Melbourne, the state capital of Victoria, Australia.

History

Healesville was first incorporated as a shire on 30 September 1887. It annexed parts of the Shire of Yea on 21 April 1925, and parts of the Shire of Eltham on 18 June 1958, while losing land to the Shire of Alexandra on two occasions; 1 October 1963 and 1 October 1984.

On 15 December 1994, the Shire of Healesville was abolished, and along with the Shires of Lillydale and Upper Yarra, and parts of the Shire of Sherbrooke, was merged into the newly created Shire of Yarra Ranges.

Wards

The Shire of Healesville was divided into three ridings, each of which elected three councillors:
 Badger Riding
 Sugarloaf Riding
 Watts Riding

Suburbs and localities
 Badger Creek
 Bend of Islands
 Castella
 Christmas Hills (shared with the Shire of Eltham)
 Chum Creek
 Dixons Creek
 Healesville*
 Narbethong
 Steels Creek
 Tarrawarra
 Toolangi
 Yarra Glen
 Yering

* Council seat.

Population

* Estimate in the 1958 Victorian Year Book.

References

External links
 Victorian Places - Healesville and Healesville Shire

Healesville
1887 establishments in Australia
1994 establishments in Australia
Yarra Ranges